Leptospermum turbinatum, commonly known as shiny tea-tree, is a species of spreading shrub that is endemic to the Grampians and nearby ranges in Victoria, Australia. It has thin, rough bark, elliptical to lance-shaped leaves with the narrower end towards the base, relatively large white flowers and fruit that remains on the plant at maturity.

Description
It has thin, rough bark with short, soft hairs on the youngest stems.

Taxonomy and naming
The species was first formally described by Joy Thompson in Telopea in 1989 based on specimens collected in 1952 on Mackays Peak in the Serra Range, in the Grampians National Park. The specific epithet refers to the shape of the fruit.

Distribution and habitat
The shiny tea-tree grows on rocky sandstone slopes and near granite outcrops in the Grampians National Park and nearby mountains.

References

turbinatum
Myrtales of Australia
Flora of Victoria (Australia)
Taxa named by Joy Thompson
Plants described in 1989